Janet Lee (born 1976) is a Taiwanese-American tennis player.

Janet Lee may also refer to:

 Janet Lee Bouvier (1907–1989), American socialite, mother of Jackie Kennedy Onassis
 Janet (Chisholm) Lee (1862–1940), Canadian co-founder of the Women's Institutes
 Janet Leigh (1927–2004), American actress
 Janet K. Lee, comic book writer, co-creator of Return of the Dapper Men with Jim McCann
 Janet Lee (psychic), self-proclaimed psychic based in Bedford Hills, New York
 Janet Lee Lam Lai Sim, the fifth spouse of the Chief Executive of Hong Kong since 2022, as the wife of Chief Executive John Lee.

See also
 Jeannette Lee, British music record executive
 Jeannette H. Lee, Korean-American entrepreneur
 Jeanette Lee, American professional pool player